{{Infobox military unit
| unit_name = Pennsylvania Army National Guard
| image = PA STARC.png
| image_size = 220px
| caption = Distinctive shoulder sleeve insignia
| dates = 
| country = 
| allegiance = 
| branch =  Army National Guard
| type = Reserve land force
| role = 
| size = 15,514
| command_structure = Pennsylvania National Guard
| commander1 = President Joe Biden(Commander-in-Chief)Christine Wormuth(Secretary of the Army)Governor Tom Wolf(Governor of the Commonwealth of Pennsylvania)
| commander1_label = Civilian leadership
| commander2 = Major General Mark J. Schindler (The Adjutant General)| commander2_label = Commonwealth military leadership
| garrison = Harrisburg, Pennsylvania
| ceremonial_chief = 
| colonel_of_the_regiment = 
| nickname = 
| patron = 
| motto = 
| colors = 
| march = 
| mascot = 
| battles = 
| notable_commanders = 
| anniversaries = 
| identification_symbol = 
| identification_symbol_label = Seal of the Pennsylvania National Guard
}}

The Pennsylvania Army National Guard, abbreviated PAARNG''', is part of the United States Army National Guard and is based in the U.S. Commonwealth of Pennsylvania.  Together with the Pennsylvania Air National Guard, it is directed by the Pennsylvania Department of Military and Veterans Affairs. The PAARNG maintains 124 armories and is present in 87 communities across the Commonwealth.

Creation
The Pennsylvania National Guard traces its lineage back to the militia organized by Benjamin Franklin in 1747 known as the Associators. Franklin organized artillery and infantry units to defend the city of Philadelphia against French and Spanish privateers. The first meeting of the Associators occurred on 21 November 1747, and on 7 Dec. 1747, the enlistees and officers were formally commissioned by the Provincial Council President, Anthony Palmer. On that day, hundreds of armed Associators presented themselves to Palmer at the Philadelphia Courthouse. Official National Guard webpages state that 'he wisely stated their activities were "not disapproved" and duly commissioned all of them.'

Only in 1755 did this volunteer militia gain official status. On November 25, 1755, the Pennsylvania Assembly passed the Militia Act of 1755. This measure 'legalized a military force from those who were willing and desirous of being united for military purposes within the province.' This was as a result of citizens' pleas for protection from the French and Indians on the western borders. Two years later, a compulsory militia law was also enacted. All males between 17 and 45 years of age, having a freehold worth 150 pounds a year, were to be organized into companies. Every enrolled militiaman was required to appear for training, arming himself, on the first Mondays of March, June, August, and November. 
 
In 1793, the Governor of Pennsylvania, Thomas Mifflin established the Adjutant General's Office to provide for "a new system for the regulation of the militia." The next year, Pennsylvania contributed 4,000 militiamen to a four-state force which quelled the Whiskey Rebellion in the western part of the state. Amongst the force were men of the First Troop Philadelphia City Cavalry, the oldest continuously serving U.S. Army unit.

The War of 1812 drew 14,000 Pennsylvanians into active service. During the war, the ancestors of three present day PA ARNG units gained campaign credit. Today those ARNG units are the 103rd Engineer Battalion, the 111th Infantry Regiment, and the Headquarters & Headquarters Troop, 2nd Squadron, 104th Cavalry Regiment. Before the Battle of Lake Erie, an artillery company provided volunteers to serve as cannoneers aboard Commodore Perry's ships. That unit is known today as Wilkes-Barre's 109th Field Artillery Regiment.

The Washington Grays of Philadelphia (also known as Volunteer Corps of Light Infantry, Light Artillery Corps, Washington Grays, Artillery Corps, Washington Grays) was a Volunteer regiment which functioned during peace and war. The Regiment was formed in 1822 and was eventually integrated into the Pennsylvania National Guard in 1879.

At the start of the American Civil War in April 1861, five units from the Lehigh Valley raced to Washington, D.C., which was under threat, in response to an urgent plea from Congress. President Lincoln proclaimed them the "First Defenders"—an honor still borne by their descendants in varied PA National Guard units.

Over 360,000 Pennsylvanians served in the Union Army, more than any other Northern state except New York. Beginning with President Abraham Lincoln's first call for troops and continuing throughout the war, Pennsylvania mustered 215 infantry regiments, as well as dozens of emergency militia regiments that were raised to repel threatened invasions in 1862 and 1863 by the Confederate States Army. Twenty-two cavalry regiments were also mustered, as well as dozens of light artillery batteries.

Pennsylvania National Guard

In 1870, the name "militia" was dropped, and the force became by state law the "National Guard of Pennsylvania."

In 1879, the Pennsylvania National Guard established a division, organized in a fashion not specifically approved by the War Department. The keystone was prescribed as the designated symbol of the National Guard of Pennsylvania on 27 August 1879.

The Pennsylvania National Guard was mobilized for the Spanish–American War and the Pancho Villa Expedition. When the United States Army created the Spanish War Service and Mexican Border Service Medals, Major General Charles M. Clement was designated as the first official recipient of each, in recognition of his status as the longest-tenured National Guard officer eligible for the medals at the time they were authorized.  Clement served in the Pennsylvania National Guard from 1877 to 1917, and commanded the 28th Infantry Division at the start of World War I.

During the mobilization after the U.S. entry into World War I in 1917, a number of previously separately numbered Pennsylvania infantry regiments were given U.S. Army designations. Thus the 109th Infantry Regiment, the 110th Infantry Regiment, the 111th Infantry Regiment, and the 112th Infantry Regiment were established. These regiments formed the two brigades (55th and 56th) of the newly designated 28th Division, which then saw war service in Europe. Alongside the four regiments of infantry were created four machine-gun battalions.

The 104th Cavalry Regiment (United States) was formed on 1 June 1921 by reorganization of the 8th Infantry, PA ARNG. It became a part of the 21st Cavalry Division. On 1 May 1922, elements of the machine gun battalions which had served in World War I were reorganized as the 213th Coast Artillery.

On 17 February 1942, as part of the triangularization of Army divisions, the previous 103rd Engineer Regiment was broken up and the 103rd Engineer Battalion established. The other battalion of the regiment became the 180th Engineer Battalion.

After being activated in February 1941, the 28th Infantry Division was reorganized in February 1942, and the 111th Infantry Regiment detached for other duties. The division trained in the Carolinas, Virginia, Louisiana, Texas, and Florida. It went overseas on 8 October 1943, arriving in South Wales. On 22 July 1944, the division landed in Normandy. It took part in the Normandy, Northern France, Rhineland, Ardennes-Alsace, and Central European campaigns. It saw 196 days of combat.

In February 1942, the 111th Regiment was re-formed as a regimental combat team in the Army Ground Forces Reserve to guard militarily important facilities in the Chesapeake Bay area. From this assignment, it was transferred to the Pacific Theater in late 1943.

After being inactivated as part of the Army on 13 December 1945 at Camp Shelby, Mississippi, the 28th Infantry Division was reorganized on 20 November 1946 and returned to the Pennsylvania Army National Guard, with its headquarters established at Harrisburg.

Among the units formed after the end of World War II reorganization of the National Guard was the 628th Tank Battalion.

Following the outbreak of the Korean War, several Pennsylvania units saw active service there. Meanwhile, the 28th Division was ordered into active federal service 5 September 1950 at Harrisburg. The Division re-opened the mothballed Camp Atterbury, Indiana and remained there from 13 September 1950 to 23 November 1951. It was sent to Germany to augment NATO forces in Germany. During the Korean War, the 28th was mobilized and deployed to Europe as a part of the NATO command defending Western Europe from the threat of Soviet attack and remained on federal service until 22 May 1954.

In June 1959 the Pennsylvania Army National Guard was extensively reorganized in line with the Pentomic (ROCID) organization then coming into force. At that time, a number of separate Tank and Field Artillery Battalions which had served through World Wars I and II were reorganized as regiments. Thus the 103rd Armor Regiment (constituted 1 June 1959, partially from the 628th Tank Bn), 107th Field Artillery Regiment, the 108th Field Artillery Regiment, the 109th Field Artillery Regiment, the es)|166th Field Artillery Regiment, the 229th Field Artillery Regiment (United States), and the 28th Aviation Company were established or re-established.

From 1959 to 1974, the 176th Air Defense Artillery Regiment was part of the force. 1-176 and 2-176 were part of the 218 AG(AD) from 1 June 1959 to 1 Apr 1963, after which the 2-176 joined the 213th Artillery Group (Air Defense) until 17 February 1968, and thereafter until 1974 just with the PA ARNG.

In 1972, widespread flooding in the aftermath of Hurricane Agnes resulted in 45 deaths and $3 billion in property damage. Nearly 13,000 Army and Air Guard members were called to state active duty to help with relief operations.

In 1987-1988 Army National Guard aviation units were converted into regiments, and thus the 104th Aviation Regiment was formed in Pennsylvania. The regiment traced its history to the activation of an aviation company for the 28th Infantry Division in 1959. In August 1989, the 165th Military Police Battalion was reorganized as the 1st Battalion, 213th Air Defense Artillery Regiment. Two years earlier, the 165th MP Bn had been headquartered in Lehighton.

After the Iraqi invasion of Kuwait in August 1990, eight Army and Air Guard units from Pennsylvania (seemingly including the 228th Transportation Det, the 121st and 131st Transportation Companies, the 28th Finance Unit, and the 3623rd Maintenance Company) were mobilized for duty during Operations Desert Shield and Desert Storm. Seemingly the four units were scheduled to all return home by May 1991. Every member returned home safely.

Following the end of the Cold War, National Guard State Partnership Programs were established across Europe. In 1993, the Pennsylvania–Lithuania National Guard Partnership was initiated.

In 1996, Pennsylvania Guard members opened roads, transported doctors and patients, and mounted dangerous helicopter rescue operations during statewide flooding and blizzards. The Philadelphia Daily News reported that the 103rd Engineer Battalion had helped clear roads in the city, in conjunction with the Pennsylvania Department of Transportation.

From that year also to 2001, hundreds of Pennsylvania soldiers and airmen deployed to Germany, Hungary (Taszar Air Base, the forward staging base) and Bosnia-Herzegovina as part of peacekeeping efforts (IFOR and SFOR) in the former Yugoslavia. In 1996–97, elements of Headquarters and Headquarters Company (HHC), 213th ASG, HHC 28th Infantry Division, the 28th Personnel Services Battalion, and the 28th Finance Battalion deployed to Europe. The 213th ASG's headquarters processed many active troops through Taszar Air Base on their way into Bosnia-Herzegovina.

Twenty-first century

In 2001, the 56th Brigade was selected as the only reserve component Brigade to be equipped with the Stryker armored personnel carrier, out of seven in the entire United States Army. The brigade was reflagged the 56th Stryker Brigade Combat Team on 24 October 2004 at Fort Indiantown Gap's Muir Army Airfield.

Elements of the 28th Infantry Division deployed twice quickly in succession to Bosnia and Kosovo as part of SFOR and KFOR from 2002. In 2002–03, the Division deployed to Bosnia-Herzegovina (SFOR) and in 2003–04 to Kosovo (KFOR).

From 2005 three brigades deployed to Iraq. The 2nd Infantry Brigade Combat Team deployed to Iraq in 2005–06, the 56th Stryker Brigade Combat Team deployed to Iraq in 2008–09, and the Combat Aviation Brigade, 28th Infantry Division, deployed in 2009.

As of February 20, 2016, under permanent order 051–03, the 55th Armored Brigade Combat Team was redesignated the 55th Maneuver Enhancement Brigade. Under permanent order #051-02 dated February 20, 2016, elements of the 165th Military Police Battalion began to be established, reforming a unit seemingly last active in 1989. As the PA National Guard gained back an MP battalion, it was once again named the 165th based upon the PA ARNG's history. The 1st Battalion, 109th Infantry regiment was transferred to the 2nd Infantry Brigade Combat Team (2nd IBCT). The 3rd Battalion, 103rd Armor Regiment was reassigned to the 278th Armored Brigade Combat Team (278th ABCT), now designated the 278th Armored Cavalry Regiment (278th ACR) Tennessee Army National Guard, with operational control remaining with the Pennsylvania National Guard.

Structure

28th Infantry Division (Mechanized)
 28th Division Headquarters and Headquarters Battalion at Harrisburg, Pennsylvania
 2nd Infantry Brigade Combat Team (2nd IBCT)
 55th Maneuver Enhancement Brigade (55th MEB) (designation changed from 55th ABCT to 55 MEB February 20, 2016)
 56th Stryker Brigade Combat Team (56th SBCT)
 28th Expeditionary Combat Aviation Brigade (28th ECAB) headquartered at Fort Indiantown Gap.
 213th Regional Support Group, headquartered at Allentown, Pennsylvania
Headquarters and Headquarters Company (HHC)
109th Public Affairs Detachment (109th PAD)
1928th Contingency Contracting Team (1928th CCT)
1902nd Contingency Contracting Team (1902nd CCT)
1955th Contingency Contracting Team (1955th CCT)
108th Area Support Medical Company (108th ASMC)
728th Combat Support Sustainment Battalion (728th CSSB)
Headquarters and Headquarters Company (HHC)
28th Finance Management Support Unit
528th Finance Detachment
628th Finance Detachment
828th Finance Detachment
928th Finance Detachment
213th Personnel Company
252nd Quartermaster Company
3622nd Maintenance Company
228th Transportation Battalion
Headquarters and Headquarters Detachment (HHD)
131st Transportation Company 
121st Transportation Company
1067th Transportation Company
721st Transportation Company
 166th Regiment (Regional Training Institute), headquartered at Fort Indiantown Gap
 1st Battalion (Maneuver)
 2nd Modular Training Battalion
 3rd Battalion Non-Commissioned Officer Academy (NCOA)
 Medical Battalion Training Site
 Eastern Army National Guard Aviation Training Site
 3rd WMD Civil Support Team, Fort Indiantown Gap. (A Chemical, Biological, Radiological, Nuclear Event Unit to support homeland defense missions.)
 3rd Chemical, Biological, Radiological, and Nuclear Task Force.
 Pennsylvania Task Force North
 Pennsylvania Task Force Fort Indiantown Gap

See also
:Category:Pennsylvania militiamen in the American Revolution
List of Pennsylvania Civil War regiments
Pennsylvania State Guard
List of United States militia units in the American Revolutionary War

 References 

 Further reading 

Weaver, Michael E. Guard Wars: The 28th Infantry Division in World War II.'' Indiana University Press, 2010.

External links

Bibliography of Pennsylvania Army National Guard History compiled by the United States Army Center of Military History
GlobalSecurity.org, Pennsylvania Army National Guard

 
State agencies of Pennsylvania
Military units and formations established in 1870